Lousy Little Sixpence is a 1983 Australian documentary film about Australian history that details the early years of the Stolen Generations and the struggle of Aboriginal Australians against the Aboriginal Protection Board in the 1930s. The film's title references the amount of pocket money that Aboriginal children were to be paid for their forced labour, although few ever received it.

Overview
Lousy Little Sixpence begins with the testimonies of survivors of the Stolen Generations who were born in the early 1900s. Later, the film documents the work of Jack Patten and the Aborigines Progressive Association in the 1930s, and ends with the Day of Mourning on 26 January 1938, which marked 150 years of European settlement in Australia.

Production
Lousy Little Sixpence took three years to research and produce. In the early stages of production, the film's producers Alec Morgan and Gerry Bostock travelled through New South Wales and Victoria while receiving unemployment benefits, looking for information on the Stolen Generations to include such as newspaper articles, films and photographs.

The film screened for six weeks at Dendy cinemas in Sydney.

Cast
Margaret Tucker as herself
Bill Reid as himself
Geraldine Briggs as herself
Flo Caldwell as herself
Violet Shea as herself
Chicka Dixon as Narrator

See also
Stolen Generations
Day of Mourning (Australia)
Aborigines Progressive Association
Aboriginal Protection Board

References

External links

Lousy Little Sixpence at Oz Movies

Films set in New South Wales
Films set in Victoria (Australia)
1983 films
1983 documentary films
Australian documentary films
Documentary films about Aboriginal Australians
Stolen Generations
1980s English-language films